An automatic deodorizer dispenser is an air freshener designed to release the encapsulated scent at a set time, or under preset conditions. Some fresheners operate by releasing a quick burst of scent every minute, 10 minutes, or 30 minutes so that you don't become too accustomed to the smell. Other kinds operate by having a light sensor or motion sensor attached, and releasing a burst of fragrance whenever this sensor is tripped.

Each bus of TransJakarta is equipped with automatic air freshener dispensers which periodically spray car fragrance in order to keep the air fresh.

Modification
Automatic deodorizer dispensers have been the target of hacking by hobbyists due to their relatively low cost.

See also
 Deodorant
 Incense
 Little Trees
 Urinal deodorizer block
 Lyral, citronellal

References

External links

Cleaning products
Perfumes